Jack Flynn (1875 - unknown) was an English footballer who played as a forward for Walsall, Bristol City, Reading and West Ham United.

Footballing career
A former player of Walsall, Bristol City and Reading, Flynn joined West Ham United in 1904. He scored on his debut, on 1 September 1904, in a 3–0 home win against Millwall Athletic. It was the first meeting between the two rivals played at the Boleyn Ground. His last game was in February 1905.

References

1875 births
English footballers
English Football League players
Reading F.C. players
Association football forwards
Walsall F.C. players
Bristol City F.C. players
West Ham United F.C. players
Date of death unknown
Place of birth missing
Place of death missing